Klösterle is a municipality in the district of Bludenz in the Austrian state of Vorarlberg.

Population

Climate

See also
 Horizon Field

References

Lechquellen Mountains
Verwall Alps
Cities and towns in Bludenz District